Bassaniana versicolor is a species of spiders in the genus Bassaniana, native to North America.

Description
The species is brown, with white spots.

References

Déjean S, Ledoux J-C (2013) "De araneis Galliae, III, 4: Bassianiana versicolor baudueri (Simon, 1932)". Revue Arachnol. 17: 88-92

External links
Bugguide species info page Bassaniana versicolor
Spiders of Europe
World Spider Catalog

Thomisidae
Spiders of North America
Spiders described in 1880